Macrarene lepidotera is a species of sea snail, a marine gastropod mollusk in the family Liotiidae.

Distribution
This marine species occurs in the Pacific Ocean off Socorro Island and Revillagigedo Islands, Mexico

References

 McLean J. 1969. New species of tropical eastern Pacific Gastropoda. Malacological Review, 2: 115-130

External links
 To World Register of Marine Species
 

lepidotera
Gastropods described in 1970